The Gipuzkoa Regional Championship (Spanish: Campeonato Regional de Guipúzcoa; Basque: Gipuzkoako Herrialde Txapelketa) was an official football tournament in Spain, organised by the Gipuzkoan Football Federation in which affiliated clubs participated. It was played annually between 1918 and 1940 and served to elect the representative of the territory in the Copa del Rey.

History 
In 1918, following several disagreements between the clubs in the North Federation of Spanish football which covered the Basque provinces of Biscay and Gipuzkoa, culminating in a pivotal championship match between Athletic Bilbao and Real Sociedad being abandoned, the National Committee of the Spanish Federation agreed to divide the existing region into separate championships. Thus, for the 1918–19 season Gipuzkoan clubs launched their own championship while the North Championship continued comprising the Biscay teams and the re-entry of Racing Santander, representing neighbouring Cantabria. In their last season as members of the North group, Gipuzkoans Real Unión took the title (following the aforementioned dispute between Athletic and Real Sociedad) and went on win the 1918 Copa del Rey.

Clubs belonging to other provinces were also affiliated to the Gipuzkoan Federation, together with those based in the province itself: clubs from Navarre and La Rioja were affiliated, the most notable being those of CA Osasuna and CD Logroño, who played in the top level of the Gipuzkoa championship; Logroño eventually even managed to win the title twice. In 1928 the Navarre Federation was founded and Osasuna left the Gipuzkoa championship, although by 1929 they had returned, with the competition becoming the 'Gipuzkoa-Navarre Combined Championship'. In 1931, clubs from Aragón were added and the name changed to the 'Gipuzkoa-Navarre-Aragón Combined Championship'; however, the Gipuzkoan teams remained dominant.

In 1934 the Spanish Federation carried out a significant restructuring of the national tournaments, so that the regional championships were replaced by superregional ones, in which the best clubs of different regional federations were grouped. In the case of the Basque region, the 'Basque Cup' was launched in 1934–35. The teams of Gipuzkoa and Navarre were integrated into the Basque Cup, while CD Logroño and the Aragón teams were integrated into a new 'Cantabria-Castile-Aragón Cup'. These tournaments were played for two years, until being interrupted by the outbreak of the Spanish Civil War.

During the last months of the war in 1939, football activity was resumed in some areas controlled by the Nationalist side, under the impulse of the Spanish Federation and the regional federations. Six teams participated in the reborn Gipuzkoa Championship, the novelty of which was the inclusion of teams from Álava in the federation, since until then they had been affiliated to the Biscay Championship. The champions Alavés and runners-up Donostia took part in the 1939 Copa del Generalísimo.

The Gipuzkoa-Navarre-Aragón Combined Championship resumed in the 1939–40 season, again providing qualification for the Spanish Cup, since then called Copa del Generalísimo. However, restructuring approved by the Spanish Federation in 1940 quickly led to the disappearance of the regional championships.

Seasons summary
{| class = wikitable sortable
!width="83"|Season
!width="100"|Champion
!Copa del Rey
!width="100"|Runner-up
! Copa del Rey
|-
| 1918–19 || Real Sociedad || Quarter-finals || Real Unión || N/A
|-
| 1919–20 || Real Unión || Semi-finals || Real Sociedad || N/A
|-
| 1920–21 || Real Unión || Semi-finals || Real Sociedad || N/A
|-
| 1921–22 || Real Unión || Runners-up || Real Sociedad || N/A
|-
| 1922–23 || Real Sociedad  || Semi-finals || Real Unión || N/A
|-
| 1923–24 || Real Unión  || Winners || Real Sociedad || N/A
|-
| 1924–25 || Real Sociedad  || Group stage || Real Unión || N/A
|-
| 1925–26 || Real Unión  || Semi-finals|| Real Sociedad || Quarter-finals 
|-
| 1926–27 || Real Sociedad  || Group stage || Real Unión || Winners
|-
| 1927–28 || Real Unión  || Group stage || Real Sociedad || Runners-up
|-
| 1928–29 || Real Sociedad  || Round of 16 || CD Logroño || Round of 16
|-
| 1929–30 || Real Unión || Quarter-finals || Real Sociedad || Round of 16
|-
| 1930–31 || Real Unión || Quarter-finals || CD Logroño || Semi-finals
|-
| 1931–32 || CD Logroño || Round of 32 || Donostia FC || Quarter-finals
|-
| 1932–33 || Donostia FC || Round of 32 || CD Logroño || Round of 16 
|-
| 1933–34 || CD Logroño || Round of 32 || Donostia FC || Round of 16
|-
| 1934–35 || Athletic Club || Round of 16 || CA Osasuna || Semi-finals
|-
| 1935–36 || Arenas Club de Getxo || Round of 16 || Real Unión || Group stage
|-
| 1936–39 || colspan=4 align=center|No competition due to the Spanish Civil War
|-
| 1939 || Deportivo Alavés || Semi-finals || Donostia FC || Quarter-finals
|-
|1939–40 || Zaragoza CF || Semi-finals || Osasuna || Round of 16
|}
Notes

Summary of Champions

Notes

See also
Gipuzkoa autonomous football team 

 References 

 Martínez Calatrava, Vicente (2001). Historia y estadística del fúbol español''. 

Defunct football competitions in Spain
Basque football competitions
Recurring sporting events established in 1918
Recurring sporting events disestablished in 1940
1918 establishments in Spain
1940 disestablishments in Spain
History of football in Spain
Sport in Gipuzkoa